is a Japanese former hammer thrower who competed in the 1964 Summer Olympics.

References

1939 births
Living people
Japanese male hammer throwers
Olympic athletes of Japan
Athletes (track and field) at the 1964 Summer Olympics
20th-century Japanese people